John Whiteley may refer to:

John Whiteley (missionary) (1806–1869), English Methodist missionary to New Zealand
John Whiteley (politician) (1898–1943), British Conservative Party politician, MP for Buckingham 1937–43
John Peter Whiteley (born 1955), British cricketer
John Scott Whiteley (born 1950), English organist
John Whiteley (British Army officer) (1896–1970), British Army general

See also
Jon Whiteley (1945–2020), British art historian and child actor
Johnny Whiteley (born 1930), English rugby league player and coach